Hotel Wilber is a historic hotel in Wilber, Nebraska. It was built in 1895 as a hotel and gathering place for social events. The builders were Isaac Hickman, Charles Whipple, G. D. Coe, and George Smith. Cultural historian Janet Jeffries Spencer of the Nebraska State Historical Society and architect D. Murphy add,

The building has been listed on the National Register of Historic Places since September 20, 1978.

References

Hotel buildings on the National Register of Historic Places in Nebraska
National Register of Historic Places in Saline County, Nebraska
Hotel buildings completed in 1895